La Madera is the name given to the easternmost part of the town of San Jerónimo in the municipality of San Martín de Hidalgo, Jalisco, Mexico. The area was known for its lumber, brought down from the Sierra de Quila, and was used for making corrals, and for house construction.

History  
The area was first known to be the property of the Medina family, they made a living by selling lumber used for housing from the Sierra de Quila. The people that lived in the San Jerónimo would go to the area saying vamos a la madera, translated as "let's go to the wood". After many years, the name of La Madera meaning "the wood" referred to the area east of San Jerónimo. The Medinas' house was known as La Casa Grande, it stood in the middle of their property and was noted for its side-porches. The place was said to be haunted. The house was destroyed to make way for an agave farm.

Other families moved into the area as well, the well-known are the Quintero and the Gómez. Magdaleno Quintero Velásquez (born 1862) was a prominent rancher in the area, his descendants live in La Madera and San Jerónimo today.

Population  
Although no official population count has been attributed exclusively to the area, El Potrerito's population is composed of approximately 67 inhabitants.

Water 
Water is provided by the Arroyo Las Minas, La Cañada, El Ceboruco, and Arroyito Blanco creeks.

Weather 
Around 1970, a small tornado coming from San Jerónimo passed through La Madera. The tornado blew off the roofs of many homes.

Populated places in Jalisco